Harry Bertram Daggett (February 25, 1857 – July 14, 1933) was an American politician who served as a member of the Wisconsin State Senate from 1925 to 1932.

Background
Daggett was born in Linn County, Iowa and later moved to West Milwaukee, Wisconsin. Daggett served as a member of the Wisconsin State Senate from 1925 to 1932. He also served as the mayor of West Milwaukee, Wisconsin and a member of the West Milwaukee Village Board. He was a Republican.

Daggett died in Minneapolis in 1933.

References

External links
The Political Graveyard
Wisconsin Historical Society

1857 births
1933 deaths
People from Linn County, Iowa
People from West Milwaukee, Wisconsin
Mayors of places in Wisconsin
Wisconsin city council members
Republican Party Wisconsin state senators
People from Minneapolis